Fruitland is a city in Muscatine County, Iowa, United States. The population was 963 at the time of the 2020 census. It is part of the Muscatine Micropolitan Statistical Area.

Geography
Fruitland is located at  (41.352283, -91.126250).  

Demographics

2010 census
As of the census of 2010, there were 977 people, 331 households, and 277 families living in the city. The racial makeup of the city was 96.7% White, 0.2% Native American, 0.4% Asian, 2.3% from other races, and 0.4% from two or more races. Hispanic or Latino of any race were 4.4% of the population.

There were 331 households, of which 41.1% had children under the age of 18 living with them, 71.3% were married couples living together, 7.3% had a female householder with no husband present, 5.1% had a male householder with no wife present, and 16.3% were non-families. 10.6% of all households were made up of individuals, and 5.1% had someone living alone who was 65 years of age or older. The average household size was 2.95 and the average family size was 3.18.

The median age in the city was 36.5 years. 29.4% of residents were under the age of 18; 6.6% were between the ages of 18 and 24; 29.8% were from 25 to 44; 27.4% were from 45 to 64; and 6.9% were 65 years of age or older. The gender makeup of the city was 49.1% male and 50.9% female.

2000 census
As of the census of 2000, there were 703 people, 242 households, and 205 families living in the city. The racial makeup of the city was 97.30% White, 0.14% Native American, 0.28% Asian, 2.28% from other races. Hispanic or Latino of any race were 3.70% of the population.

There were 242 households, out of which 39.3% had children under the age of 18 living with them, 72.3% were married couples living together, 7.9% had a female householder with no husband present, and 14.9% were non-families. 9.1% of all households were made up of individuals, and 2.9% had someone living alone who was 65 years of age or older. The average household size was 2.90 and the average family size was 3.06.

In the city, the population was spread out, with 26.3% under the age of 18, 8.0% from 18 to 24, 32.7% from 25 to 44, 27.0% from 45 to 64, and 6.0% who were 65 years of age or older. The median age was 35 years. For every 100 females, there were 103.2 males. For every 100 females age 18 and over, there were 107.2 males.

The median income for a household in the city was $57,250, and the median income for a family was $57,708. Males had a median income of $42,171 versus $24,464 for females. The per capita income for the city was $20,270. About 1.4% of families and 2.4% of the population were below the poverty line, including 2.7% of those under age 18 and none of those age 65 or over.

June 1, 2007 tornado 
Fruitland and two neighboring cities were struck by an EF-2/EF-3 Tornado on Friday, June 1, 2007. Fruitland City Hall and the Fruitland Post Office were destroyed. Injuries were reported with this storm; however, there were no deaths from the twister. City Hall was moved to a temporary "trailer office" until the new Fruitland Community Center was built and finished later in 2007.

Education
Louisa–Muscatine Community School District operates the area public schools for this municipality.

References

Cities in Iowa
Cities in Muscatine County, Iowa
Muscatine, Iowa micropolitan area